Abaxitrella is a genus of crickets in the subfamily Podoscirtinae and tribe Podoscirtini. This genus has species recorded from southeast China and Vietnam.

Species 
Two species are currently known:
Abaxitrella hieroglyphica (Gorochov, 2002) - type species
Abaxitrella uncinata Ma & Gorochov, 2015

References

External links
 

Ensifera genera
Crickets
Orthoptera of Indo-China